Arancibia is a district of the Puntarenas canton, in the Puntarenas province of Costa Rica.

History 
Arancibia was created on 9 November 2000 by Ley 8044.

Geography 
Arancibia has an area of  km² and an elevation of  metres.

Demographics 

For the 2011 census, Arancibia had a population of  inhabitants.

References 

Districts of Puntarenas Province
Populated places in Puntarenas Province